Alex Skuby (born December 27, 1972) is an American actor who has appeared in film and television. He is most known for his role on The King of Queens as Doug Pruzan, Carrie's boss and a lawyer at her Manhattan law firm.

Born in Neptune City, New Jersey, Skuby grew up in Manasquan, New Jersey. Skuby graduated from Wall High School in 1990 and attended Brookdale Community College.

He is the co-host of comedy podcast "Zen AF" with comedian Wayne Hannah and filmmaker Tyler Boyco.

Filmography

Film

Video games

References

External links

Alex Skuby on YouTube

1972 births
Living people
Male actors from New Jersey
American male film actors
American male television actors
Brookdale Community College alumni
People from Manasquan, New Jersey
People from Neptune City, New Jersey
Wall High School (New Jersey) alumni
20th-century American male actors
21st-century American male actors